Tirur is a Municipality in Malappuram district in the Indian state of Kerala spread over an area of .

Demographics
 India census, Tirur had a population of 53,650, of which 48% are male and 52% female. Tirur has an average literacy rate of 80%, higher than the national average of 59.5%: male literacy is 81%, and female literacy is 78%. In Tirur, 14% of the population is under six years of age. Tirur assembly constituency is part of Ponnani (Lok Sabha constituency).

Transportation
Railway Station: Tirur railway station is one of the major railway stations in the Malabar region. Almost every train stops here, connecting the Malappuram district to the rest of the country. 
Road: Tirur is well connected to the other cities by road, even though no National Highway passes through the town. The Chamravattom bridge connects Kochi with Kozhikode. There are regular buses plying between Tirur and nearby major towns and cities like Malappuram, Ponnani, Manjeri, Valanchery, Kuttippuram, Kottakkal,Tanur, Parappanangadi, Kozhikode, Ernakulam, Guruvayur, Thrissur, Kochi, Trivandrum, Alappuzha, Kottayam, Coimbatore, Bangalore and all major cities. There are a few private buses offering overnight journeys to Bangalore.

Educational institutions 
There are many schools in Tirur, ranging from private and government schools to two colleges and a polytechnic school.

Gallery

See also
Ayyaya
Niramarutur
Tunchan Parambil
Thunchath Ezhuthachan Malayalam University

References

External links 

 Thunchan Memorial Research Centre - Official Website
 Vellamassery GarudanKavu - Official Website

Cities and towns in Malappuram district
Populated coastal places in India